The Battle of Natural Bridge was fought during the American Civil War in what is now Woodville, Florida near Tallahassee on March 6, 1865. A small group of Confederate troops and volunteers, which included teenagers from the nearby Florida Military and Collegiate Institute that would later become Florida State University, protected by breastworks, prevented a detachment of United States Colored Troops from crossing the Natural Bridge on the St. Marks River.

The Natural Bridge is a  stretch along which the St. Marks River runs underground, after dropping into a sinkhole.

Battle
The Union's Brig. Gen. John Newton had undertaken a joint force expedition to engage and destroy Confederate troops that had attacked at Cedar Keys, Florida and Fort Myers and were allegedly encamped somewhere around St. Marks. The Union Navy had trouble getting its ships up the St. Marks River. The Union Army force, however, had advanced and, after finding one bridge destroyed, started before dawn on March 6 to attempt to cross the river at Natural Bridge. The Union troops initially pushed Rebel forces back, but not away from the bridge.

Sailors from USS Hendrick Hudson also participated, and two were awarded the Medal of Honor for their part in this battle: Seaman John Mack and Coxswain George Schutt.

Confederate forces under Brigade General William Miller, protected by breastworks, guarded all of the approaches and the bridge itself. The action at Natural Bridge lasted most of the day, but, unable to take the bridge in three separate charges, the Union troops retreated to the protection of the fleet.

Based on the involvement of the students from the Florida Military and Collegiate Institute, the Florida State University Reserve Officer Training Corps (ROTC) program is one of only four Army ROTC programs to have a battle streamer for their actions in the Civil War. Since it was originally part of the Army, FSU's Air Force ROTC unit also displays the same battle streamer.

Monument

The site of the battle is now Natural Bridge Battlefield State Historic Site, a Florida State Park, and contains a monument with the inscription:

It is notable that even though the inscription claims that Tallahassee was the only capital of the South not captured by the Union during the Civil war, in actuality Austin Texas was also not captured during the war and never had enemy troops in any direction from it in a 100 mile radius, unlike Tallahassee had.

Annual Memorial Service and Battle Reenactment

A ceremony honoring the combatants on both sides of the Battle of Natural Bridge, followed by a reenactment of the battle featuring Union, Confederate, and civilian reenactors, is held at the park the first weekend of March every year. The event is free and open to the public.

The site is now called Natural Bridge Battlefield Historic State Park. The Civil War Trust, a division of the American Battlefield Trust, and its partners have acquired and preserved  of the battlefield that are now part of the state park.

See also
Military history of African Americans in the U.S. Civil War
United States Colored Troops
Historical reenactment
List of Florida state parks
List of Registered Historic Places in Leon County, Florida

Notes

External links
Natural Bridge Battlefield Historic State Park - Florida State Parks
Photos of the annual Battle of Natural Bridge reenactment
Natural Bridge Historical Society
Union Account by Captain Thos. Chatfield
Map of the Battle - Civil War Trust 
http://m.palmbeachpost.com/news/news/local/post-time-the-civil-war-battle-of-natural-bridge/nkH5w/

References

Natural Bridge
Natural Bridge
Natural Bridge
History of Leon County, Florida
1865 in the American Civil War
1865 in Florida
March 1865 events